This is a list of current and former members of the National Assembly of Nepal.

A

B

C

D

F

G

H

J

K

L

M

N

O

P

R

S

T

U

V

Y

Notes

References

External links 

 नेपालको निर्वाचनको इतिहास
 संसदीय विवरण पुस्तिका, प्रतिनिधि सभा / महासभा (२०१६ - २०१७) (Parliament Report Booklet, House of Representatives / Senate (1959 - 1960) (in Nepali)
 संसदीय विवरण पुस्तिका, राष्ट्रिय सभा (२०४८ - २०५९) (Parliament Report Booklet, National Assembly (1991 - 2006)) (in Nepali)

 
National Assembly